The Sydney Coordinated Adaptive Traffic System, abbreviated SCATS, is an intelligent transportation system that manages the dynamic (on-line, real-time) timing of signal phases at traffic signals, meaning that it tries to find the best phasing (i.e. cycle times, phase splits and offsets) for a traffic situation (for individual intersections as well as for the whole network). SCATS is based on the automatic plan selection from a library in response to the data derived from loop detectors or other road traffic sensors.

SCATS uses sensors at each traffic signal to detect vehicle presence in each lane and pedestrians waiting to cross at the local site. The vehicle sensors are generally inductive loops installed within the road pavement. The pedestrian sensors are usually push buttons. Various other types of sensors can be used for vehicle presence detection, provided that a similar and consistent output is achieved. Information collected from the vehicle sensors allows SCATS to calculate and adapt the timing of traffic signals in the network.

SCATS is installed at about 55,000 intersections in over 180 cities in 28 countries. In Australia, where the system was first developed, the majority of signalised intersections are SCATS operated (around 11,000).

The SCATS system is owned by the Australian state of New South Wales, whose state capital is Sydney. In December 2019, Transport for NSW, the transport and road agency in New South Wales, began to look into commercialising the SCATS system.

Features

Default operation
The architecture of SCATS  is at two basic levels, LOCAL and MASTER. The LOCAL is the control cabinet at the roadside, which provides the normal signal control as well as processing of traffic information deduced from the vehicle detectors. The MASTER is a remote computer which provides area based traffic control, i.e. area traffic control (ATC) or urban traffic control (UTC). Detailed traffic signal and hardware diagnostics are passed from the LOCAL to the MASTER, with the ability to notify staff when a traffic signal has a fault.

SCATS is able to operate over PAPL, ADSL, PSTN and 3G IP network connections to each intersection. SCATS can also operate on a network of private cables not requiring third party telecommunications support and large parts of inner Sydney have always operated this way.

Priority levels
Public vehicle priority in SCATS (using data provided from PTIPS) caters for both buses and trams. SCATS has a facility to provide three levels of priority:

 High – In the high priority mode the "hurry call" facility is used. (i.e. the phase needed by a bus, tram or emergency vehicle is called immediately, skipping other phases if necessary)
 Medium (Flexible window) – Phases can be shortened to allow the bus/tram phase to be brought in early. The bus/tram phase can occur at more than one place in the cycle.
 Low – takes its turn.

Trams would normally be given high priority, the aim of which is to get the tram through without it stopping. Buses would normally expect to receive a medium level of priority.

Instant fault detection and quick repair
The ATC system is equipped with the function of fault detection and logging the fault detected in order to facilitate repair and maintenance. Should there be a telecommunication breakdown, the ATC junction controller concerned will switch to standalone mode and continue to function.

Traffic Adaptive Operation
ATC systems provide advanced method of traffic signal control called Traffic Adaptive Control where the operational timing plans including cycle length, splits and offsets are continuously reviewed and modified in small increment, almost on a cycle-by-cycle basis, to match with the prevailing demand measured by the detectors connected to the on-street traffic controllers.

SCATS Ramp Metering System
The SCATS Ramp Metering System (SRMS) is a SCATS subsystem and controls traffic signals at the entries of motorways and integrates with SCATS intersection control for promoting integrated real-time management of the traffic corridor as a whole. The objective of SRMS, based on current traffic conditions, is to efficiently determine:
 When ramp metering signals start and end ramp metering operation
 The metering flow rates of the operating ramp metering signals
 Which actions shall be taken to signalised intersections of the corridor to promote network-wide benefits.
SRMS achieves these objectives by implementing a collection of pre-configured adaptive intelligent strategies either automatically or manually. In manual mode, the SRMS operator can create new or manipulate existing rules in order to adjust the ramp metering system for effective operation during any planned or unplanned events (e.g. incidents).
SRMS is a distributed control system that operates on a central control server and road-side traffic controllers. The central control server is a component of SCATS and inherently provide integrated motorway and arterial real-time management. The road-side controllers are installed on motorway on-ramps and are used to:
 Set the traffic signal times 
 Set the state of on-ramp changeable signs 
 Manage the sequences start and end ramp metering operation; and 
 Measure traffic states using vehicle detectors.
Metering rates are determined by the local traffic signal controller or by the central control server. Metering rates can be determined in two ways: 
 adaptive operation, or
 time-of-day-based operation typically when a communications failure or critical vehicle detector failures take place
The adaptive operation optimises mainline traffic state by using real-time data from vehicle detector stations installed at several mainline locations, ramps and optionally at arterial roads. The adaptive operation determines control actions at 10 seconds intervals and applies some or all of the following strategies simultaneously:
 Coordinated ramp metering
 Ramp queue management
 Automatic begin and end of ramp metering operation
 Variation routines for integration with SCATS intersection control
 Variation routines for automated incident responses and unusual circumstances
 Manual controls for incident responses and unusual circumstances
 Critical lane occupancy calibration
 Fault-tolerant strategies
 Data logging for performance reporting and off-line analysis
SRMS is currently used as the Auckland ramp metering system.

Simulation
SCATS can be simulated in-the-loop (SCATSIM) using third party traffic simulation tools. SCATSIM offers an interface supported by Aimsun, PTV VISSIM, Quadstone Paramics and Commuter. SCATSIM offers kerb-side hardware and firmware emulation that interfaces seamless to the SCATS Region and Central Manager offering the same control strategies used in field deployments for both intersections and ramp metering (SRMS). The configuration files prepared by authorities for the Central Manager, Region, SRMS and kerb-side controllers can be re-used without modification by SCATSIM.

When Commuter software was acquired by Autodesk, Azalient Ltd support for the Commuter interface was deprecated. Azalient Ltd also developed a plugin that enabled the Quadstone Paramics interface to SCATSIM. This plugin is also deprecated.

History
SCATS was developed in Sydney, Australia by the New South Wales Department of Main Roads (a predecessor of Transport for NSW) in the 1970s. It began to be used in Melbourne in 1982, Adelaide, South Australia in 1982 and Western Australia in 1983.

It is also used in New Zealand, Hong Kong, Shanghai, Guangzhou, Amman, Tehran, Dublin, Rzeszów, Gdynia, Central New Jersey, and in part of Metro Atlanta, among several other places. In Hong Kong, SCATS is currently adopted in the area traffic control systems at Hong Kong Island, Kowloon, Tsuen Wan and Shatin.

The system may be referred to by an alternative name in a specific installation. However, since deployment outside Australia, New Zealand and Singapore, localised names do not appear to be commonly used. The following are some local alternative names that have been or are in use:

 Canberra "CATSS" (Canberra Automated Traffic Signal System)
 Melbourne "SCRAM" (Signal Co-ordination for Regional Areas of Melbourne)
 Adelaide "ACTS" (Adelaide Co-ordinated Traffic Signals)
 Perth "PCATS"
 Singapore "GLIDE"
 Northern Territory "DARTS"

SCATS is a recognised worldwide market leader in intelligent transport systems. Transport for NSW is continuing to develop SCATS to meet emerging technological, user and traffic demands.

See also
PTIPS - works together with SCATS to provide transport vehicles with priority at traffic signals

Other Intelligent Transportation Systems include:
STREAMS
BLISS
Inductive loop vehicle detection

References

External links
Roads ACT
Roads and Maritime Services, NSW
SCATS - Sydney Coordinated Adaptive Traffic System Website
SCATS  - Main Roads Western Australia
Traffic Lights in NSW - Roads and Maritime Services Website
RTA and SCATS at the 17th ITS World Congress in Korea
Review of Bus Priority at Traffic Signals around the World

Intelligent transportation systems
Traffic signals